[[Image:TV-icon-2.svg|thumb|110px| Official Video]'']]

The men's 4 × 400 metres relay competition at the 2012 Summer Olympics in London, United Kingdom. The event was held at the Olympic Stadium on 9–10 August. It was won by the Bahamas.

The qualifying round experienced more drama than is normal in these affairs.  In the first heat, on the second leg, Kenya's Vincent Mumo Kiilu was boxed in near the back of the pack, with South Africa's Ofentse Mogawane on his shoulder.  Coming into the home straight, Kiilu tried to step to the outside, tripping Mogawane, leaving him injured on the track.  The much awaited return of Oscar Pistorius waiting to run the third leg never materialized.  South Africa filed a protest in which Kenya was disqualified and South Africa was allowed to run in the final. Conveniently, the London Olympic Stadium track has 9 lanes to accommodate such a circumstance, while normally only 8 lanes are used in Championship meets.

At the finish of the first heat, Trinidad and Tobago won the heat, setting their National Record, but host Great Britain was given exactly the same time.

In the second heat the United States led off with Manteo Mitchell.  Halfway around the track, Mitchell heard a crack and felt pain.

Mitchell continued to the hand off, running a sub-par 46.1 split.  It was later revealed that Mitchell did break his left fibula. His American teammates continued on, running three sub 45 splits.  Bahamas won the heat, but the Americans qualified, credited with exactly the same time as Bahamas, the fastest time in 2012.  Both heats ending with the first and second place teams running the same times.

Also during the second heat, the Dominican Republic failed to make the second exchange between Felix Sánchez and Joel Mejía within the zone and were disqualified. Then halfway through the third leg, Jamaica's Jermaine Gonzales pulled a muscle and was unable to continue.

In the final, Bahamas started off with their best 400 runners, 4th place Chris Brown and 7th place Demetrius Pinder.   Brown had a clear lead through the first 350 metres before fading to hand off just slightly ahead of Bryshon Nellum.  Over the next leg, Josh Mance brought the American team into contention, with the two teams separating from the rest of the field.  On the final straightaway, Pinder extended the lead slightly, his relay split of 43.3 credited as the 7th (now 9th) fastest relay splits in history.  On the third leg, Tony McQuay passed Michael Mathieu early on the back stretch and extended the lead by a few metres.  McQuay's split was reported to be 43.4. Last minute fill in Angelo Taylor took the baton in the lead, but Ramon Miller ran up to maintain contact.  Coming off the final turn, he moved past Taylor with 50 meters to go and won. Trinidad and Tobago again improved their national record in winning the bronze. It was only the third time an American team had been beaten in the Olympic 4 × 400 metres relay.

Oscar Pistorius ran the anchor leg for the South African team, but they were already well beaten before he received the baton.

The fifth place Russian team was later disqualified when two of its members received doping bans in 2017 after a re-test of their samples.

Records
, the existing World and Olympic records were as follows.

The Following new National records were set during this competition

Schedule

All times are British Summer Time (UTC+1)

ResultsQ denotes automatic qualification (based on place).q denotes provisional qualification (fastest non-automatic qualifiers).DNS denotes did not start.DNF denotes did not finish.DQ denotes disqualifiedAR denotes area record.NR denotes national record.PB denotes personal best.SB denotes season's best.

Round 1

Qual. rule: first 3 of each heat (Q) plus the 2 fastest times (q) qualified.Heat 1Note: *South Africa's Ofentse Mogawane was injured in a collision with Kenya's Vincent Mumo Kiilu and failed to hand over to Oscar Pistorius who was supposed to run the third leg.Heat 2'''

 At approximately the 200-metre mark of the first leg, American runner Manteo Mitchell broke his left fibula.  However, he still managed to finish his leg with a time of 46.1.

Final

Note: South Africa was allowed to continue as the ninth finalists on appeal. Louis van Zyl replaced the injured Ofentse Mogawane.

References

Athletics at the 2012 Summer Olympics
Olympics 2012
Relay foot races at the Olympics
Men's events at the 2012 Summer Olympics